Rebel Creek may refer to:

Rebel Creek (Nevada), a stream
Rebel Creek, Nevada, an unincorporated community